Araniella proxima is a species of orb weaver in the spider family Araneidae. It is found in North America, Europe, a range from Russia (Europe to Far East), Turkey, Iran, and Kazakhstan.

References

External links

 

Araniella
Articles created by Qbugbot
Spiders described in 1885
Taxa named by Władysław Kulczyński